Remposian was a region and family of the old Armenia c. 400–800. The country was in Salmas o Zaravand and part of Her (modern-day Khoy).

The ruler about 451 was Nerchapuh Remposian.

See also
List of regions of old Armenia

Early medieval Armenian regions